Ani... Dr. Kashinath Ghanekar is a 2018 Indian Marathi Biographical drama film directed and written by Abhijeet Deshpande. The film follows the life of Marathi film actor Kashinath Ghanekar. It was jointly produced by Sunil Phadtare under the Shree Ganesh Marketing & Films with Viacom18 Motion Pictures. Subodh Bhave played the role of Kashinath Ghanekar, with Sonali Kulkarni, Vaidehi Parashurami, Sumeet Raghavan and Nandita Dhuri-Patkar in supporting roles.

Plot 
Dr. Kashinath Ghanekar is a dental surgeon from Bombay (Mumbai) decides to pursue acting. Despite facing various personal and  professional hurdles. Kashinath was the first superstar of Marathi cinema. Most notable character is "Lalya" in the Ashroonchi Zhali Phule which was played by him.

Cast 

 Subodh Bhave as Dr. Kashinath Ghanekar
 Vaidehi Parashurami as Kanchantai Ghanekar
 Sonali Kulkarni as Sulochana Latkar
 Sumeet Raghavan as Shriram Lagoo
 Mohan Joshi as Bhalji Pendharkar
 Prasad Oak as Prabhakar Panshikar
 Anand Ingle as Vasant Kanetkar
 Nandita Dhuri-Patkar as Dr. Irawati Bhide Ghanekar
 Amruta Khanvilkar as Sandhya Shantaram (Chandrakala) 
 Suhas Palshikar as Master Dattaram
 Pradeep Velankar as Kashinath's father
 Prajakta Mali as Asha Kale (special appearance in "Gomu Sangtina" song)
 Swapnil Rajshekhar
 Suved Kulkarni as Dinkar Phule
 Nandkishor Choughule

Production

Casting 
Actor Subodh Bhave was Abhijeet's first choice to play Ghanekar's character. Abhijeet stated, "When I knew that there is so much Complexity in the character and the story, I wanted an actor who can project all those different shades of the same person! So, I first thought Subodh and went straight to him."

Characters 
Vaidehi Parashurami was cast as Kanchantai Ghanekar second wife of Kashinath Ghanekar. Sonali Kulkarni approached for role of Sulochana Latkar. Amruta Khanvilkar and Prajakta Mali were next cast in supporting roles. While it was known that Amruta would play the role of Actress Sandhya Shantaram whereas Prajakta played the role of well-known Marathi actress Asha Kale.

Soundtrack 

The songs were composed by Rohan-Rohan & Ajit Parab while the lyrics are written by Guru Thakur and Sachin Phatak. The soundtrack album was released in 2018.

The song "Gomu Sangtina" and "Tumhavar" originally  composed by Hridaynath Mangeshkar and Ram Kadam respectively, sung by Hemant Kumar, Asha Bhosle & Usha Mangeshkar respectively.

Release and reception 
The film released in India on 8 November 2018 and in United States 9 November 2018. The satellite rights were sold to Colors Marathi and Shemaroo MarathiBana.

Critical reception 
Upon release, the film received positive reviews from critics. Ganesh Matkari from Pune Mirror gave it 3.5 out of 5 stars, concluding that, "Fantastic acting by all is an icing on the cake in this gripping story of Marathi Stage Superstar. The film keeps you involved till end is in itself is a great success of the film."

The Times of India gave it 3.5 stars out of 5, concluding, "The mention of Kashinath Ghanekar would bring Bhave's image in front of the eyes. All in all, the film is worth a watch."

Box office 
Ani... Dr. Kashinath Ghanekar opened on a strong note at the box office.

References

External links 
 
 

2010s Marathi-language films
2018 biographical drama films
2018 drama films
2018 films
Films about actors
Indian biographical drama films
Films scored by Rohan-Rohan